Dichromatic may refer to:

 Dichromacy, a form of color-blindness in which only two light wavelengths are distinguished rather than the usual three
 Dichromatic, describing an optical device which splits light into two parts according to its wavelength: a form of dichroism
 A form of polymorphism (biology), typical in sexual dimorphism, in which two phenotypes have different colouration or ornamentation.
 Dichromatic reflectance model
 Dichromatism: the property of a substance that changes hue due to change in its concentration or the thickness of a layer.

See also
 Chromatic